Indochina Airlines was a Vietnamese airline based in Ho Chi Minh City. It was the first operational private airline based in Vietnam, originally licensed in May 2008 as Air Speed Up. The founder and chairman of the board was Vietnamese musician Hà Hùng Dũng. Indochina Airlines began selling tickets on 12 November 2008 and launched its first commercial flights from Tân Sơn Nhất International Airport in Ho Chi Minh City to Nội Bài International Airport in Hanoi and Đà Nẵng International Airport in Đà Nẵng on 25 November 2008. After a series of difficulties, including unresolved debts and a decrease in customers, Indochina Airlines ceased flying on November 25, 2009; its schedule was revoked two days later.

Establishment
The company was first incorporated and licensed as "Air Speed Up" in May 2008. The Vietnamese name, Tăng Tốc, as spelled, means "speed up"; however, if written without accents (i.e., Tang Toc), the name would translate to "death and grief". For this reason, the company applied for a name change soon after it was licensed. Initially, company chairman Hà Hùng Dũng planned to purchase the Viet Airways brand owned by Jetstar Pacific Airlines, but Jetstar Pacific declined the sale, citing the desire to develop the Viet Airways brand in the future.

Destinations
Indochina Airlines ended service to all destinations in November 2009. While active, it served the following destinations:

Vietnam
 Đà Nẵng – Đà Nẵng International Airport
 Hanoi – Nội Bài International Airport
 Ho Chi Minh City – Tân Sơn Nhất International Airport Base

Fleet 
The Indochina Airlines fleet, at its peak, consisted of two wet-leased Boeing 737-800s. Due to financial problems, the airline's last remaining aircraft was returned to its lessor Travel Service Airlines on November 25, 2009. Indochina Airlines was officially declared bankrupt on December 15, 2009.

References

Defunct airlines of Vietnam
Airlines established in 2008
Airlines disestablished in 2009
2008 establishments in Vietnam
2000s disestablishments in Vietnam
Defunct low-cost airlines